Markham Island is a small but conspicuous island lying just off Oscar Point in the northern part of Terra Nova Bay, Victoria Land, Antarctica. It was discovered in February 1900 by the British Antarctic Expedition (1898–1900) under C.E. Borchgrevink, who named it after Sir Clements Markham.

See also 
 List of antarctic and sub-antarctic islands

References

Islands of Victoria Land
Scott Coast